Hayriye Hanımsultan ("bless" or "lucky"; June 1846 – 26 July 1869) was an Ottoman princess, the daughter of Adile Sultan and Damat Mehmed Ali Pasha.

Biography
Hayriye Hanımsultan was born in June 1846. Her father was Damat Mehmed Ali Pasha, son of Elhac Ömer Agha, and her mother was Adile Sultan, daughter of Sultan Mahmud II and Zernigâr Hanım. She had three full siblings, Sultanzade Isma'il Bey, Sıdıka Hanımsultan, Aliye Hanımsultan, of whom all died in infancy. She had a half-brother, Mahmud Edhem Pasha, who married Sultan Abdulmejid I's daughter, Refia Sultan, and one half-sister, Hatice Hanım. She took her piano lessons from Turkish composer, poet and writer Leyla Saz.

On 10 June 1865, she was betrothed to Ahmed Rıfat Bey, son of Mehmed Kani Pasha. However, six months later the engagement was broken off. According to one source, Kani Pasha, who was known for his arrogance, didn't wanted to present an expensive gift to the princess. According to another source, she was in love with Ali Rıza Bey, son of İşkodralı Mustafa Şerif Pasha. After the engagement was broken off, Ahmed Rıfat Bey's military service was terminated. He was then sent to Saint Petersburg.

On 17 April 1866, she married Ali Rıza Bey. The wedding took place on 22 April 1866 in the Kuruçeşme Palace. The couple were given a villa in Çamlıca as their residence. She had two sons and a daughter, but all died in infancy, and several stillbirth. After her father's death in 1868, she built a convent (tekke) near his mausoleum in Eyüp. 

She died of tuberculosis on 26 July 1869, and was buried in the mausoleum of her father.

Ancestry

References

Sources

1846 births
1869 deaths
Royalty from Istanbul
19th-century Ottoman princesses